Franck Soler (born 3 October 1970) is a retired French football striker.

References

1970 births
Living people
French footballers
France youth international footballers
AJ Auxerre players
FC Martigues players
Paris FC players
Gazélec Ajaccio players
Racing 92 players
Association football forwards
Ligue 1 players
Ligue 2 players